Rasskazovka is a station on the Kalininsko-Solntsevskaya line of the Moscow Metro. It opened on August 30, 2018 as part of the "Ramenki" - "Rasskazovka" extension and is the southern terminus.

Construction
Excavation was due to start in September 2014, and by June 2015, work was under way on the construction of the main reinforced concrete structures and waterproofing the inner surface.

The first tunnel reached the station in November 2015, while the second tunnel was completed in February 2016. By October 2016, the station was 90% complete. The platforms were completed in June 2017. In May 2018, the metro station Rasskazovka is ready for commissioning.

Location
Rasskazovka station is the final station on the line after Novoperedelkino. It is on Borovskoye Highway in the village of Rasskazovka in the Novomoskovsky Administrative Okrug of Moscow, bordering the district of Novo-Peredelkino. The station is about 5 km from Vnukovo Airport.

Future
A future extension of the Kalinin-Solntsevo Line will take the line toward Vnukovo International Airport. According to the head of the Moscow Department of Construction, work toward the extension could begin after 2022. The extension would include two new stations, Pykhtino and Vnukovo.

References

Moscow Metro stations
Kalininsko-Solntsevskaya line
Railway stations in Russia opened in 2018
Railway stations located underground in Russia